Nicholas Charles Williams (born 1961) is an English painter and draughtsman. Born in Surrey, he trained at Richmond College, London. His work aims to examine aspects of human behaviour, conveyed through symbolism and direct observational painting. He has been the subject of solo shows at various galleries, including the Russell-Cotes Museum, Bournemouth, Royal Cornwall Museum, Truro Cathedral, and Liverpool Cathedral for European Capital of Culture 2008.  In 2001 he was awarded the Hunting Art Prize  and in 2008 shortlisted for the Threadneedle Figurative Prize.

Williams now lives and works in Cornwall, South West England and is a lifelong surfer. His studio is a former lifeboat station on the North coast of Cornwall.

Hockney–Falco thesis
Two paintings  by Williams, made for scientific analysis examining David Hockney's thesis on the use of optics by the Old Masters, have been presented in numerous lectures at major academic institutions and galleries throughout Europe and the USA.  Presentations (led by Dr. David G. Stork) have taken place at Metropolitan Museum of Art; The Venice Biennale; The Louvre; National Gallery, London; Kunsthistorisches Museum, Vienna; de Young Museum, San Francisco; Oxford University; Cambridge University; Stanford University; Getty Research Institute; and the Museum of Modern Art, New York.

Collections
British Museum
Bournemouth Central Public Library
Bluestone Design, Plymouth
Falmouth Art Gallery
Frissiras Museum in Athens
Hunting PLC, London

Selected bibliography
1995 Daily Telegraph, Mail on Sunday, Sunday Express
2001 Art Review, London Evening Standard, Financial Times, Galleries
2003 Daily Telegraph, Hunting Art Prizes 25th Anniversary Catalogue: William Packer
2004 New York Times, Sunday Herald, Scotland
2006 Madame Figaro Voyage Japon

Critical reception
William Packer, art critic: “Nicholas Charles Williams is one of British Art's well-kept secrets.. even so his reputations is growing fast as both one of the most accomplished figurative artist of his generation, and one of the most unusual.  Indeed there is no one else that I can think of who places himself quite so firmly in the great tradition of early Baroque, yet with no sense of anachronism or pastiche.”

Ian Dejardin, Director, Dulwich Picture Gallery: "Williams may paint like a modern-day Counter-Reformation artist, but his subject matter is worlds away and unique to him, visually and intellectually gripping."

Brian Sewell, art critic: "The quality of the painting seemed to me astounding".

Mark Bills, Curator of Paintings Prints & Drawings, Museum of London: "An artist who has such a comfortable and informed relationship with the art of the past...he is able to draw on a large number of sources to produce fresh and vibrant images drawn and explored with consummate skill....they emerge from observation and the intimacy of the artist with his subject."

References

External links
Nicholas Charles Williams website

1961 births
Living people
People from Surrey
20th-century English painters
English male painters
21st-century English painters
British Realist painters
Painters from Cornwall
20th-century English male artists
21st-century English male artists